Bilimora Junction railway station is a small railway station in Navsari district, Gujarat, India. Its code is BIM. It serves the city of Bilimora. The station consists of five platforms. The platforms are not well sheltered. It lacks many facilities including water and sanitation. Passenger, Express and Superfast trains halt here.

Bilimora is a junction railway station in the Mumbai division line of the Western Railway, from which a narrow-gauge line separates from the broad-gauge line to arrive at Waghai in the Dang district. It is said to be that this narrow-gauge line is to be converted into broad gauge and will be extended up to Manmad. Bilimora will be well connected through Maharashtra; the survey has been done and the project is to be evaluated for estimate. The town of Chikhli is about 10 km to the east, which is on National Highway 48.

Trains

The following trains halt at Bilimora Junction railway station in both directions:

 19019/20 Bandra Terminus–Haridwar Express
 19033/34 Valsad–Ahmedabad Gujarat Queen Express
 12929/30 Valsad–Vadodara Intercity Superfast Express
 22953/54 Mumbai Central–Ahmedabad Gujarat Superfast Express
 12935/36 Bandra Terminus–Surat Intercity Express
 19015/16 Mumbai Central–Porbandar Saurashtra Express
 22929/30 Dahanu Road–Vadodara Superfast Express
 20907/08 Dadar–Bhuj Sayajinagari Express
 19217/18 Bandra Terminus–Veraval Saurashtra Janta Express
 12921/22 Mumbai Central–Surat Flying Ranee Superfast Express
 22927 Bandra Terminus–Ahmedabad Lok Shakti Superfast Express

Gallery

References

Railway stations in Navsari district
Mumbai WR railway division
Railway junction stations in Gujarat